Daren John Heerspink (born April 2, 1984) is a former gridiron football offensive tackle. He most recently played for the BC Lions of the Canadian Football League. He was signed by the Miami Dolphins as an undrafted free agent in 2008. He played college football at Portland State.

Heerspink has also been a member of the St. Louis Rams.

College career
Heerspink was three-year starter and a two-time Second-team All-Big Sky at RT in 2006 and 2007. Moved into the starting lineup for the last two games of the season after an injury to Adrian Limbrick in '05. Backup offensive lineman, got into eight games, mainly in special teams situations in '04. Redshirted the '03.

Professional career

Miami Dolphins
He was signed by the Miami Dolphins as an undrafted free agent in 2008. Heerspink was signed to the Dolphins practice squad after being waived a week earlier.

St. Louis Rams
After being cut by the Dolphins, Heerspink signed with the Rams on March 19, 2009. He was waived on July 1, 2009.

BC Lions
Heerspink signed with the BC Lions on July 6, 2009 and joined their practice roster.

On July 16, he moved up to the starting left tackle position on the Lions roster.

On June 15, 2010 during training camp Heerspink was released by the Lions.

References

External links
Just Sports Stats

BC Lions bio

1984 births
Living people
Players of American football from Washington (state)
American football offensive tackles
American players of Canadian football
Canadian football offensive linemen
Portland State Vikings football players
Miami Dolphins players
St. Louis Rams players
BC Lions players